Strand7 is a  Finite Element Analysis (FEA) software product developed by the company with the same name.

History 

The Strand computer software was first developed by a group of academics from the University of Sydney and the University of New South Wales. Further to this early research work, an independent company called G+D Computing was established in 1988 to develop an FEA program that could be used commercially for industrial applications. Between 1988 and 1996 the company researched, developed and marketed a series of DOS and Unix based FEA programs, most notably its STRAND6 program. In 1996 the company commenced work on a completely new software development specifically for the Windows platform. This product was first released in 2000 and was named Strand7. In 2005 the company also changed its name to Strand7 to better reflect its primary focus.

Application 

Some high-profile applications of Strand7 include the optimisation of the "Water Cube" Beijing National Aquatics Center for the 2008 Beijing Olympics, the "Runner" sculpture that was placed on top of Sydney Tower during the 2000 Sydney Olympics and the Terminal 2E roof, Charles de Gaulle Airport.

Analysis Capabilities 

Strand7 is most commonly used for the construction and mechanical engineering sectors, but also has seen use in other areas of engineering including aeronautical, marine and mining.

Strand7 includes the following solvers:
 Linear static 
 Natural frequency 
 Buckling 
 Nonlinear static 
 Linear and nonlinear transient dynamic 
 Spectral and harmonic response 
 Linear and nonlinear steady-state heat transfer 
 Linear and nonlinear transient heat transfer

References

External links 
The Strand7 website

Finite element software